Chayanka is a rural locality (a selo) in Brasovsky District, Bryansk Oblast, Russia. The population was 96 as of 2010. There are 3 streets.

Geography 
Chayanka is located 40 km northeast of Lokot (the district's administrative centre) by road. Verkhny Gorodets is the nearest rural locality.

References 

Rural localities in Brasovsky District